Benjamin 'Ben' Bayly is a New Zealand chef. Bayly is known for judging My Kitchen Rules NZ alongside Gareth Stewart. He appeared as a VIP guest during a challenge in MasterChef New Zealand season seven, episode 16.

Background
Ben Bayly grew up in Te Awamutu, his dad's side full of dairy farmers and his mum's full of Irish Catholics. He attended Te Awamutu College.

Personal life
Bayly is married. He and his wife have children.

References

New Zealand chefs
New Zealand people of Irish descent
Living people

Year of birth missing (living people)
People educated at Te Awamutu College